Lunga is a commune in Florești District, Moldova, just south of the R13 and north of the Raut river.

References

Villages of Florești District